Valerian D'Souza (3 October 1933 – 25 February 2020) was an Indian Roman Catholic bishop.

D'Souza was born in India and was ordained to the priesthood in 1961. He served as bishop of the Roman Catholic Diocese of Poona, India, from 1977 to 2009. He died on 25 February 2020.

Notes

1933 births
2020 deaths
21st-century Roman Catholic bishops in India
20th-century Roman Catholic bishops in India